The 1913–14 English football season was the 26th season in the Football League for Aston Villa.

"The Wellington Whirlwind," played as a centre forward for Aston Villa from 1904 to 1920.

Villa started the season with a goal-less draw at Bradford City before losing 3-0 away to Sunderland.

Table

Results

References

External links
AVFC History: 1912–13 season

Aston Villa F.C. seasons
Aston Villa F.C.